Yadvendradev Vikramsinh Jhala is an Indian scientist and conservationist. He recently ended his tenure as the Dean at the Wildlife Institute of India in Dehradun.

Jhala led a long-term research project on Asiatic lions. Since 2002, Jhala has been working with Project Tiger, where he designed and led the implementation of national scale population assessments for tigers, other carnivores, ungulates and monitoring of habitats. The last national assessment of 2018–19, where he led the implementation of scientific components, was accorded a status of the Guinness world record for the largest wildlife survey with camera traps.

Currently he is the Dean of the Wildlife Institute of India, in charge of the conservation initiatives of reintroducing the cheetah in India, and species recovery of the Great Indian Bustard in India.

Career 

Jhala has worked with Rajesh Gopal and subsequent heads of Project Tiger.

He teaches courses in quantitative ecology, population ecology, conservation biology, and field research techniques to Masters, Doctoral and Diploma students at the Wildlife Institute of India.

Awards and distinctions 

In December 2022, Jhala was elected a fellow of the Indian National Science Academy  (INSA). His citation read:

"Professor Y V Jhala has been elected a fellow of INSA for his outstanding contribution to and leadership in the field of tiger ecology, conservation and management.        Prof. Jhala’s research spans an array of topics including ecology, behaviour, genetics, evolution, participatory conservation and policy on tigers, lions and other large carnivores. His pioneering leadership on the science behind large carnivore census is key to tiger conservation globally. Dr. Jhala has emerged as an important figure in the global effort to conserve, study and manage one of the highest profile endangered species in the world. He has been credibly able to succeed at navigating his outstanding scientific works with the conservation and management of flagship carnivore species in the field."

Jhala has received the Carl Zeiss Award and the Wildlife Service Award-2008 by Sanctuary Asia and Royal Bank of Scotland for “Tiger Conservation Work in India”.

A Guinness world record accorded to Wildlife Institute of India and National Tiger Conservation Authority for the most extensive wildlife survey through trail cameras was bestowed to the 2018–19 tiger survey in India for which Jhala and Prof Qamar Qureshi are the lead scientists.

Filmography

 Counting Tigers, National Geographic Society and iTV, 2019
 Great Indian Bustard Documentary
 Decoding the man eaters of Sundarbans, Animal Planet 2017
 Desert Wolves of India, BBC Wildlife Series, 2004
 Man-eaters of India, National Geographic Television 1997

See also 

 MK Ranjitsinh Jhala
 Digvijaysinh Jhala
 Population ecology
 Quantitative ecology

References

External links 

Dr. YV Jhala, Dean of the Wildlife Institute of India, at Ear to the Wild Foundation Auction
BNHS 133 years - Dr.Y. V. Zala on Wildlife Conservation in India
Dr. Y.V Jhala presenting a talk at International Conservation Conference, AMU
LifePage Career Talk on Wildlife Conservation and Science

1962 births
Living people
20th-century Indian biologists
Guinness World Records
Indian ecologists